Estero Bay may refer to:

 Estero Bay (California), U.S.
 Estero Bay (Florida), U.S.